In Just That Kind of a Mood was the first studio album (in the U.S) by singer/songwriter Jonny Blu, released in the United States on November 6, 2006 by Dao Feng Music and Sound Cubed Studios. It is a mix of original Swing, Big Band and Vocal Jazz/Pop compositions by Jonny Blu and some classic American songbook standards.

Track listing
 "Smilin' Eyes (Ain't Always Nice)"  – 2:53
 "The Girl from Ipanema"  – 2:52
 "How Can I"  – 3:35
 "I Need Love" – 3:58
 "Ooh-Wee"  – 3:45
 "In Just That Kind of a Mood"  – 3:56
 "King of the Road"  – 3:03
 "Always, Forever You and Me" – 2:40
 "Are You Lonesome Tonight?"  – 2:15
 "I Get No Kick from Champagne"  – 3:07
 "Your Birthday Song (Aka The Birthday Song)"  – 2:04

Personnel

Musicians
 Jonny Blu – vocals, music arrangements
 Myke Aaron – piano, music arrangements
 Bob Malone – piano
 Mark Miller – guitar
 Ricky Zahariades – guitar
 Chris Golden – bass
 Chris Tedesco – trumpet
 Martin Blasick– trombone
 Doug Webb – saxophone, woodwind, clarinet, flute
 Jimmy Paxson – drums, percussion

Production
 Myke Aaron – producer, engineer, mixing
 Jonny Blu – producer, arranger
 Myke Aaron – mixing, mastering

International album variations

References

External links
 Official website

2006 albums
Jonny Blu albums